Erebus walkeri is a moth of the family Erebidae. It is found in Angola, the Comoros, the Democratic Republic of Congo, Ghana, Kenya, La Réunion, Madagascar, Malawi, Mauritius, Mozambique, Nigeria, Rwanda, the Seychelles, South Africa (KwaZulu-Natal), São Tomé & Principe, Tanzania, Gambia, Uganda, Zambia and Zimbabwe.

References

Moths described in 1875
Erebus (moth)